Casula railway station is located on the Main South line, serving the Sydney suburb of Casula. It is served by Sydney Trains T2 Inner West & Leppington and T5 Cumberland line services.

History
Casula station opened on 1 November 1894. In October 1993, a footbridge was installed. Due to its low patronage, Casula is unattended by staff.

As part of the construction of the Southern Sydney Freight Line, which opened to the east of the station in January 2013, Casula received an easy access upgrade with lifts to the platforms and the existing footbridge extended. The level crossing was replaced in September 2012 with a new road constructed from the north.

The Casula Powerhouse arts centre is located adjacent to the station's eastern side.

Platforms & services

References

External links

Casula station details Transport for New South Wales

Easy Access railway stations in Sydney
Railway stations in Sydney
Railway stations in Australia opened in 1894
Main Southern railway line, New South Wales
City of Liverpool (New South Wales)